SaxonAir Charter Limited is a British-based private charter airline based in Norwich, England. Based at Norwich International Airport the airline operates charters in the United Kingdom and Western Europe.

History 
On 5 April 2007, SaxonAir started trading from a small office in the back of a hangar at Norwich International Airport, with entrepreneur co-founders Christopher Mace and James Palmer, and was overseen by chairman and associated co-founded Graeme Kalbraier. Kalbraier owns and runs an insurance call handling centre in Ipswich, UK called Call Connection. SaxonAir's primary role was to operate Kalbraier's own aircraft for company use, and when not being used by him or his staff, to offer his aircraft out to the air charter market for ad hoc, bespoke, private air charter.

On 11 July 2008, SaxonAir gained acceptance of its own Air Operator's Certificate/AOC.  On the same date SaxonAir Charter Limited attained its United Kingdom Civil Aviation Authority Type B Operating Licence, permitting it to carry passengers, cargo and mail on aircraft with 19 seats or less.

Once the AOC had been issued SaxonAir agreed a management contract on a second aircraft, this time based at Nottingham East Midlands Airport. This aircraft is no longer operated by SaxonAir having been withdrawn from its operations in June 2009.

SaxonAir had been negotiating since its formation to build a dedicated Business Aviation Centre, which it looked to have secured investment for, However, following the downturn and subsequent recession, the investment was no longer available as planned.

The investment was found however, through the sale of the company on the 15 May 2009 to Mr Roger Klyne. Mr Klyne purchased the company from the founders with former shareholders Christopher Mace becoming Managing Director and James Palmer the Commercial Manager.

When Mr Klyne bought SaxonAir he transferred the operation of two aircraft owned by Klyne Aviation, a Hawker 400XP and a Citation Mustang.  A Beechcraft King Air 350 on order by Klyne Aviation for June 2009 delivery will also be operated by SaxonAir.

In spring 2010 SaxonAir opened a £6m Business Aviation Centre at Norwich International Airport, which is capable of handling aircraft as large as the Gulfstream and the Global Express.

SaxonAir become one of the first UK private charter operators to fly the Hawker 400XP which the company announced to industry on August 3, 2010.

In July 2011, SaxonAir announced that it had based one of its aircraft, a Citation Mustang, at Thessaloniki Airport in Greece, in partnership with Catreus Ltd.

In April 2012, as part of the company's drive to become part of the local business community, SaxonAir joined the Norfolk Chambers of Commerce.

Fleet

References

External links 

Charter airlines of the United Kingdom
2007 establishments in England